George Lear (February 16, 1818May 23, 1884) was a prominent Doylestown, Pennsylvania lawyer and banker, who served as state attorney general.

Life and career

Lear was the son of Robert Lear, a farmer, and his wife Mary (Meloy) Lear, both from Bucks County.  He initially worked as a teacher and store clerk, but also studied law, mostly on his own, and was admitted to Bucks County bar in 1844.  He stumped for Polk-Dallas in the 1844 election.  He was appointed the county's Deputy Attorney General in 1848, which he stayed at until the position was superseded by an elected District Attorney.

In 1845 Lear married Sydney White.  They had three children, Henry, Cordelia and Mary.  Henry would become a lawyer.

In 1865, Lear was appointed president of the Doylestown National Bank, which position he kept until his death.  His son Henry was his successor.

Lear was a leading participant in the state's 1872–73 constitutional convention.  In 1875, he was appointed state attorney general, which he served until 1879.

Lear died at home in 1884, and was buried in the Doylestown cemetery.

References

Further reading

External links
 

1818 births
1884 deaths
Pennsylvania Attorneys General
Pennsylvania lawyers
19th-century American lawyers
19th-century American politicians